Huguette Labelle  (born April 15, 1939) is a Canadian retired civil servant and former Chancellor of the University of Ottawa, serving from 1994 until 2012. She has been the chair of the Independent Advisory Board for Senate Appointments since 2016.

Born in Rockland, Ontario, she received a Master of Education and Doctor of Philosophy in education from the University of Ottawa.

From 1973 to 1980, she held senior management posts in the Department of Indian and Northern Affairs and in Health and Welfare Canada. From 1980 to 1985, she was Under Secretary of State for the Department of the Secretary of State. In 1985, she was Associate Secretary to the Cabinet and Deputy Clerk of the Queen's Privy Council for Canada. From 1985 to 1990, she was the Chairperson of the Public Service Commission of Canada. From 1990 to 1993, she was the Deputy Minister of Transport.

From 1993 to 1999, she was the president of the Canadian International Development Agency.  Labelle headed the Canadian delegation which participated in the first Tokyo International Conference on African Development in October 1993.
 
In 1998, she was the deputy head of the Millennium Bureau of Canada. She retired in 1999.

In 2002, she was appointed to the Board of Governors of the Canadian Centre for Management Development.

In 1994 she was appointed Chancellor of the University of Ottawa, and served until 1 February 2012 when she was replaced by the Right Honourable Michaëlle Jean.

In November 2005, she was appointed Chair of the Board of Directors of Transparency International.

On January 19, 2016, she was appointed to Chair the Independent Advisory Board for Senate Appointments, to advise the Prime Minister on Senate appointments.

Honours
 In 1989 she was made an Officer of the Order of Canada and was promoted to Companion in 2001.
 In 1993, she was awarded the Vanier Medal of the Institute of Public Administration of Canada, "awarded to a person who has shown distinctive leadership and accomplishment in Canadian public service" .
 In 1998, she was presented with the Outstanding Achievement Award of the Public Service of Canada, "presented to senior public servants who have distinguished themselves by a sustained commitment to excellence" .
 In 2001, she was made an Officer of the Ordre de la Pléiade, an order honouring achievement in La Francophonie.
 In 2001, she became a member of the Order of Canada. U. of Ottawa Bio
 In 2005, she received the Order of Red Cross, Companion Level First Woman President of the Canadian Red Cross.
 In 2008, she was presented with the PRIX DE LA FONDATION in the framework of the Crans Montana Forum
 In 2011, she was made a Member of the Order of Ontario.
 She has received honorary degrees from the University of Notre Dame, Brock University, the University of Saskatchewan, Carleton University, the University of Ottawa, York University, Mount Saint Vincent University, the University of Windsor, University of Manitoba, Saint Paul University, and Saint Francis Xavier University.
Mme Labelle at Transparency International
 Emeritus Governor at University of Ottawa

Notes
  Institute of Public Administration of Vanier Medal {dead link}
  Outstanding Achievement Award of the Public Service of Canada{dead link}

References

External links

 University of Ottawa biography{dead link}
Former chancellor U. Of Ottawa
Short Bio of Labelle
Bio of a Prominent Canadian Woman - Hugette Labelle
2006 Higher Education Conference in Paris

1939 births
Living people
20th-century Canadian civil servants
Chancellors of the University of Ottawa
University of Ottawa alumni
Companions of the Order of Canada
Members of the Order of Ontario
People from Clarence-Rockland
Franco-Ontarian people